Karo United Football Club is an Indonesian football club based in Kabanjahe, Karo Regency, North Sumatra. They currently compete at Liga 2. In the 2021–22 Liga 3, Karo United came out as champions after defeating Putra Delta Sidoarjo, this is their first title in the club's history.

History 
Karo United FC was declared on July 28, 2019 in Medan City by a board led by the initiator and the Club President Arya Mahendra Sinulingga. This club was founded with the aim of being a new force for football in North Sumatra

In their debut season in the Indonesian football league, Karo United managed to win the 2019 Liga 3 North Sumatra zone after defeating PS Bhinneka with a score of 5–2 and advancing to the regional round. In the regional round, Karo United managed to beat PSLS Lhokseumawe with an aggregate score of 3–2. With this result, they advanced to the 2019 Liga 3 National Round. However, Karo United had to stop in the round of 16 after losing on penalties to Persidi Idi. That way, their dream of promotion to Liga 2 had to run aground.

On 17 June 2021, Arya Mahendra Sinulingga has resigned from his position as president club and his position was given to Theopilus Ginting who previously served as manager club. The position of manager left by Theopilus Ginting was later held by Yosephine Sembiring.

After 3 years they established and played in the Liga 3 North Sumatra zone and the national round, in the 2021–22 season, they qualified for the semifinals of the league and automatically qualified for promotion to Liga 2 next season. And in the final match, they managed to become champions in Liga 3 this season after beat Putra Delta Sidoarjo on penalties which ended with a score of 4–2.

Honours
 Liga 3
 Champions: 2021–22
 Liga 3 North Sumatra
 Champions: 2019

Players

Current squad

Coaching Staff

Supporters  
This football club with the nicknames "Simbisa Warriors" and "Andalas Goat" (Andalas serow) has a group of supporters (supporters) called Karomania. Apart from being based in Karo Regency, Karomania is also found in several areas in North Sumatra, such as Deli Serdang Regency, Langkat Regency, Binjai, and Medan. Furthermore, the presence of a Karo United FC supporter group has also been formed in Jakarta which is nicknamed Karomania Jakarta.

Maskot
The name of the Karo United FC mascot is "Beidar". The Karo United FC mascot is an Andalas goat (Andalas Serow) who wears the Karo United jersey.

Nickname
 Simbisa Warriors
is the nickname of Karo United FC. Simbisa Warriors means knights, brave and honorable.
 The Andalas Goat
Andalas Goat or Andalas Serow (Capricornis sumatraensis) originating from the forest Mount Sinabung is an icon of Karo United FC. The Beidar goat (Sumatran goat) known as the Andalas Goat, is a strong animal, capable of running fast, agile, and capable of jumping high above other animals.

References

External links
 
 

Karo Regency
Football clubs in Indonesia
Football clubs in North Sumatra
Association football clubs established in 2019
2019 establishments in Indonesia